Fighter Squadron 162 or VF-162 was an aviation unit of the United States Navy established on 1 September 1960 and disestablished on 29 January 1971.

Operational history

Vietnam
VF-162 served 6 Vietnam deployments:

1 August 1963 – 10 March 1964, operating F-8As from the 
5 April-16 December 1965, operating F-8Es from the USS Oriskany. On 5 October F-8E #150848 was hit by a SA-2 Guideline SAM over North Vietnam, the pilot ejected successfully and was rescued.
29 May-16 November 1966, operating F-8Es from the USS Oriskany. On 11 July F-8E #150902 was hit by anti-aircraft fire over North Vietnam, the pilot ejected successfully and was rescued. On 14 July F-8E #150908 was damaged in a dogfight with a Vietnam People's Air Force (VPAF) MiG, the pilot CDR Dick Bellinger ejected successfully and was rescued. On 19 July F-8E #150919 was shot down southeast of Hanoi, the pilot LT Terry Dennison was captured but died in captivity, his remains were returned in March 1974. On 6 August F-8E #150300 was hit by antiaircraft fire, the pilot ejected successfully and was rescued. On 6 October F-8E #145924 was hit by antiaircraft fire, the pilot ejected successfully and was rescued. On 9 October CDR Dick Bellinger shot down a VPAF MiG-21.
16 June 1967 – 31 January 1968, operating F-8Es from the USS Oriskany. On 16 July F-8E #150925 was hit by an SA-2, the pilot ejected successfully and was rescued. On 19 July F-8E #150899 was damaged by antiaircraft fire and crashed on landing, the pilot CDR Herbert Hunter was killed. On 20 July F-8E #150916 crashed into the sea on launch, the pilot ejected underwater and was rescued. On 11 September F-8E #150910 crashed due to lack of fuel the pilot ejected successfully and was rescued. On 26 October F-8E #150310 was hit by an SA-2, the pilot LTJG Charles Rice ejected successfully, was captured and released on 14 March 1973. On 14 December LT Richard Wyman shot down a VPAF MiG-17. On 4 January F-8E #150865 was hit by an SA-2, the pilot LTJG Richard Minnich was killed and his remains were returned in December 1985.
1 February-18 September 1969, operating F-8Js from the 
On 30 April F-8H #148650 crashed into the sea on launch the pilot ejected successfully and landed on the carrier deck. On 8 May F-8H #147916 crashed into the sea while landing, the pilot ejected successfully and was rescued. On 12 August F-8H #148660 experienced fuel problems while on a combat air patrol, the pilot ejected successfully and was rescued. On 20 October F-8H #148643 suffered engine failure on takeoff, the pilot ejected successfully and was rescued.

VF-162 had the second highest combat loss rate after VF-111 of the F-8 fighter units deployed to Vietnam.

Home port assignments
The squadron was assigned to these home ports:
NAS Miramar

Aircraft assignment
F4D-1 Skyray
F-8A/E/J/H Crusader

See also
History of the United States Navy
List of inactive United States Navy aircraft squadrons
List of United States Navy aircraft squadrons

References

External links

 Website for former squadronmembers

Strike fighter squadrons of the United States Navy